The United States national beach volleyball team participates in international beach volleyball competitions and is governed by USA Volleyball.

Tournament record

Summer Olympics

World Championship

Current women's roster
Beach National Team as of June 26, 2022:

Current men's roster
Beach National Team as of March 8, 2018:

Beach A2 Team as of March 8, 2018:

See also
 United States men's national volleyball team
 United States women's national volleyball team

References

External links
Official website

Beach
National women's volleyball teams
National men's volleyball teams